Hibbertia exutiacies is a species of flowering plant in the family Dilleniaceae and is endemic to Australia. It is a small, spreading to low-lying shrub with linear leaves that are triangular in cross-section, and yellow flowers with four to eight stamens arranged in a single cluster on one side of the two carpels.

Description
There are four to eight stamens in a single cluster on one side of the two hairy carpels, each with four ovules.

Taxonomy
Hibbertia exutiacies was first formally described in 1955 by Norman Arthur Wakefield in The Victorian Naturalist from specimens collected by St. Eloy D'Alton.

Distribution and habitat
This hibbertia grows in woodland, usually in gravelly soil and occurs in central Victoria, south-eastern South Australia and parts of Queensland.

Conservation status
Hibbertia exutiacies is classified as of "least concern" under the Queensland Government Nature Conservation Act 1992.

References

exutiacies
Flora of South Australia
Flora of Queensland
Flora of Victoria (Australia)
Plants described in 1955